Saint-Aoustrille is a commune in the Indre department in central France.

It is named after the 7th-century Saint Austregisilus.

Population

See also
Communes of the Indre department

References

Communes of Indre